The National Academy of Sciences of the Republic of Armenia (NAS RA) (Hayastani Hanrapetut’yan gitut’yunneri azgayin akademia) is the Armenian national academy, functioning as the primary body that conducts research and coordinates activities in the fields of science and social sciences in Armenia. It is a member of the International Science Council.

History
The Academy of Sciences of the Armenian Soviet Socialist Republic was founded on 10 November 1943, on the basis of the Armenian Branch of the Soviet Academy of Sciences, which was established almost 10 years earlier, in 1935. Among its founders were Joseph Orbeli, Stepan Malkhasyants, Ivan Gevorkian and Victor Ambartsumian; Orbeli became the first president of the academy.

Presidents
Joseph Orbeli (1943–1947)
Victor Ambartsumian (1947–1993)
Fadey Sargsyan (1993–2006)
Radik Martirosyan (2006–2021)
Ashot Saghyan (2021-present)

Structure
Division of Mathematical and Technical Sciences
Institute of Mathematics
Institute of Mechanics
Institute for Informatics and Automation Problems

Division of Physics and Astrophysics
Byurakan Astrophysical Observatory
Institute of Radiophysics & Electronics
Institute of Applied Problems of Physics
Institute for Physical Research

Division of Natural Sciences
Center for Ecological Noosphere Studies
Institute of Biochemistry
Institute of Botany
G.S.Davtyan Institute of Hydroponics Problems
Scientific and Production Center Armbiotechnology
Institute of Biotechnology Scientific and Production Center “Armbiotechnology”
“Institute of Microbiology” Scientific and Production Center “Armbiotechnology”
Division of Natural Sciences Microbial Depository Center
Institute of Molecular Biology
Institute of Physiology
Scientific Center of Zoology and Hydroecology
Scientific Center of Zoology and Hydroecology- Institute of Zoology
Scientific Center of Zoology and Hydroecology- Institute of Hydroecology and Ichthyology

Division of Chemistry and Earth Sciences
Scientific Technological Center of Organic and Pharmaceutical Chemistry
Institute of Fine Organic Chemistry of Scientific - Technological Center of Organic and Pharmaceutical Chemistry 
Institute of Organic Chemistry of Scientific - Technological Center of Organic and Pharmaceutical Chemistry 
Molecular Structure Research Center of Scientific - Technological Center of Organic and Pharmaceutical Chemistry 
Institute of Chemical Physics
Institute of General and Inorganic Chemistry
Institute of Geological Sciences
Institute of Geophysics and Engineering Seismology after A. Nazarov

Division of Armenology and Social Sciences
Institute of History
Institute of Philosophy and Law
M. Kotanyan Institute of Economics
Institute of Archaeology and Ethnography
Institute of Oriental Studies
H. Acharian Institute of Language
M. Abeghyan Institute of Literature
Institute of Art
Museum-Institute of Genocide
Shirak Armenology Research Center
Armenian Encyclopedia Publishing House
All Armenian Foundation Financing Armenological Studies

See also
Karlen G. Adamyan

References

External links 
Official website
International Scientific-Educational Center of National Academy of Sciences of Armenia
About Armenian National Academy of Sciences

Armenia
Research institutes in Armenia
Science and technology in Armenia
USSR Academy of Sciences
Language regulators
1943 establishments in the Soviet Union
Scientific organizations established in 1943
Armenian studies
Members of the International Council for Science
Members of the International Science Council